Oskar Jenny (born June 17, 1939) is a retired Swiss professional ice hockey player who played for HC Davos in the National League A. He also represented the Swiss national team at the 1964 Winter Olympics.

References

External links
Oskar Jenny's stats at Sports-Reference.com

Living people
People from Davos
1939 births
HC Davos players
Ice hockey players at the 1964 Winter Olympics
Olympic ice hockey players of Switzerland
Sportspeople from Graubünden